Attack the Gas Station 2 is a 2010 South Korean action comedy film, starring Ji Hyun-woo and Jo Han-sun. It is the sequel to Attack the Gas Station (1999), and was released on January 21, 2010.

Plot
It's been 10 years since Mr. Park's gas station was attacked by motorcycle gangs. To get his revenge, Park hires a quartet of dodgy boys: a lethal puncher, a footballer with a killer high kick, a potbellied wrestler, and a video game addict who mastered the art of bluffing. But these employees turn out to be more dangerous when they demand their overdue salaries. With a smile of conversion, they wait for the biker raiders to attack, but the bikers don't come, and a gang of high school students riding scooters attack the gas station, and the case goes in an unexpected direction.

Cast

Ji Hyun-woo - One Punch
Jo Han-sun - High Kick
Moon Won-joo as Body-twist
Jung Jae-hoon - Yaburi
Baek Jeong-min - Jjangdol
Park Yeong-gyu - gas station owner
Park Sang-myun - Mang-chi
Lee Hyeon-ji - Myeong-rang, female student
Kwon Yong-woon - narrator manager
Tak Teu-in - Beol-goo
Lee Mi-do - Lee Mi-do
Na Hae-ri - Na Hae-ri
Lee Se-mi - Lee Se-mi
Jo Deok-hyun - Jo-jung Daily reporter
Ko In-beom - revival owner
Lee Myeong-ho - Pal-bong
Kim Yoon-sung - motorcycle gang leader
Hwang Sang-kyung - motorcycle gang member 1
Kim Jung-woon - motorcycle gang member 2
Kim Seung-wan - prison officer
Park Ji-yeon - woman thinking about the past 2
Kim Do-yeon - woman thinking about the past 3
Park Jin-young - One Punch's father
Kim Dae-ho - chicken restaurant owner
Jang Hang-jun - director
Lee Mi-so - female student getting statutory rape
Kim Sang-jin - soccer team coach
Kim Su-ro - Ha Re-yi (cameo)
Kim Sun-a - herself (cameo)

References

External links
 
 

South Korean sequel films
South Korean action comedy films
CJ Entertainment films
Cinema Service films
Films directed by Kim Sang-jin (film director)
2010 action comedy films
2010s Korean-language films
2010s South Korean films